Piz Tea Fondada (also known as Monte Cornaccia) is a mountain of the Ortler Alps, located on the border between Italy and Switzerland. On its southern Italian side it overlooks the Lago di Cancano. On its northern Swiss side it overlooks the Val da Tea Fondada, part of the Val Mora.

References

External links
 Piz Tea Fondada on Hikr

Ortler Alps
Mountains of the Alps
Alpine three-thousanders
Mountains of Switzerland
Mountains of Italy
Mountains of Graubünden
Italy–Switzerland border
International mountains of Europe